Barkowo  is a settlement in the administrative district of Gmina Gryfice, within Gryfice County, West Pomeranian Voivodeship, in north-western Poland.

History
Following the decisions at Potsdam Conference, the village's German population was forced out of their homes in March 1946.

References

Barkowo